In military terms, 74th Division may refer to:

 74th Division (People's Republic of China), 1949–1952; later the 70th Motorized Infantry Brigade
 74th Division (2nd Formation)(People's Republic of China), 1969–1976
 74th (Yeomanry) Division,  a Territorial Force infantry unit of the British Army in the First World War
 74th Infantry Division (United States)
 74th Rifle Division (Soviet Union), see list of infantry divisions of the Soviet Union 1917–57

See also

 List of military divisions by number